Veliny is a municipality and village in Pardubice District in the Pardubice Region of the Czech Republic. It has about 500 inhabitants.

Geography
It lies in the Orlice Table.

History
The first written mention of Veliny is from 1365. From 1497 to 1560, it was owned by the Pernštejn family. In 1560, it was acquired by Emperor Ferdinand I.

Sights
The main historical landmark is the complex of the wooden timbered Church of Saint Nicholas from with a morgue and a bell tower. The church was built in the late Baroque style in 1752 and the bell tower with morgue in 1750.

References

External links

Villages in Pardubice District